Weekapaug is a census-designated place in southern Washington County, Rhode Island, part of the town of Westerly, Rhode Island. The population was 425 at the 2010 census.

History
"Weekapaug" is a Narragansett word meaning "at the end of the pond".  The area is not as well known as neighboring Watch Hill, Rhode Island, even though it has had summer cottages since 1877. It was known as "Noyes Beach" from 1701 to 1899, named after Reverend James Noyes who purchased .

Geography
According to the United States Census Bureau, the CDP has a total area of 1.20 mi (3.1 km). 1.16 mi (3.0 km) of it is land and 0.036 mi (0.09 km) of it (3.00%) is water. The Winnapaug and Quonochontaug salt ponds dominate the area.  Each pond is open to the Atlantic Ocean via a breachway lined with rock jetties.  Most of the rock is granite which is readily available in the Westerly area and used to be its primary industry.

Demographics

In popular culture

Al Harrington -- a rapid-talking recurring character on Family Guy -- is president and CEO of Al Harrington's Wacky Waving Inflatable Arm-Flailing Tube Man Emporium and Warehouse on Route 2 in Weekapaug.  (The southern terminus of Route 2 is actually about 9 miles or 14.5 km northeast of Weekapaug.) In Season 18 episode 3 of the series, Babs and Peter visit Weekapaug, which is revealed as her hometown. 

Phish's song "Weekapaug Groove" is named after the town.

References

 Aubin, George Francis. (1975). A Proto-Algonquian Dictionary. Ottawa : National Museums of Canada.
 Huden, John C. (1962). Indian Place Names of New England, Museum of the American Indian Heye Foundation.

External links
 Weekapaug Foundation
 espo.gso.uri.edu timeline
 Phish History

Census-designated places in Washington County, Rhode Island
Westerly, Rhode Island
Providence metropolitan area
Census-designated places in Rhode Island
Populated coastal places in Rhode Island